The Proto–Three Kingdoms period (or Samhan period) refers to the proto-historical period in the  Korean Peninsula,  after the fall of Gojoseon and before the maturation of Goguryeo, Baekje, and Silla into full-fledged kingdoms.  It is a subdivision of what is traditionally called Korea's Three Kingdoms Period and covers the first three centuries of the Common Era, corresponding to the later phase of the Korean Iron Age.

History

When Gojoseon was defeated by the Han dynasty of China in 108 BC, the northern region of the peninsula and Manchuria was occupied by the states of Buyeo, Goguryeo, Okjeo, Dongye, and other minor statelets.  Goguryeo's traditional founding date is 37 BC, but it was mentioned in Chinese records as early as 75 BC.  China installed four commanderies in former Gojoseon territory, but three of them fell quickly to Korean resistance.  Goguryeo gradually conquered and absorbed all its neighbors, and destroyed the last Chinese commandery in 313.

In the south, the little-understood state of Jin had given rise to the loose confederacies Jinhan, Byeonhan, and Mahan, or collectively, Samhan.  Baekje was founded in 18 BC in Mahan territory and began to slowly overtake it.  Silla was founded by the unification of six chiefdoms within the Jinhan, traditionally in 57 BC, although it may have been somewhat later.  Byeonhan was absorbed into the later Gaya confederacy, which in turn was annexed by Silla.

Because of this continuity, most historians consider the Three Kingdoms to begin around the fall of Gojoseon, but the three did not dominate the peninsula as kingdoms until around 300.

Iron culture
Important features of this period include the widespread production of iron artifacts for daily use and the introduction of grey earthenware pottery with a beaten pattern.

Archaeological finds of the period are mainly from Nakrang and Goguryo in the north and Samhan in the south. Bronze and iron were used and iron made at shell midden sites on the southern coast. 

Artifacts typical of the Korean Bronze Dagger culture, some Han Chinese culture, and Northern Steppe cultures have been found together on archaeological sites in this region, indicating independent and extensive interactions by the Koreanic kingdoms and statelets with Han China and various other areas.

The introduction of iron technology enabled the manufacture and use of stronger and sharper weapons and agricultural tools, resulting in an acceleration of political integration, as well as greater concentrations of power and wealth.

Trade
Trade is documented in the "Annals of the Three Kingdoms" of Records of the Three Kingdoms, which states that iron from the Nakdong River basin was exported to Lolang and Wae of Japan.  Contact with the cultures of the lower basin of the Nakdong River is demonstrated by archaeological evidence from China, Wae, and Manchuria.

In the southern part of the Korean Peninsula, Chinese bronze mirrors, three-legged bronze ritual vessels, bronze buckles, and Chinese coins have been found both from shell middens and tombs. Examples of artifacts originating from the Northern Province include bronze 'Fu' vessels, tiger-shaped buckles, and horse-shaped buckles. Objects from Wae include Yayoi pottery, jar coffins, wide bronze spearheads and bronze halberds.

See also
History of Korea
Four Commanderies of Han
National Treasure of South Korea
Three Kingdoms of Korea

External links
 Archaeology Wordsmith
 Daegu National Museum

History of Korea
Archaeological cultures of East Asia
Iron Age cultures of Asia
Archaeological cultures in Korea